Tel Aviv Museum of Art ( Muzeon Tel Aviv Leomanut) is an art museum in Tel Aviv, Israel. The museum is dedicated to the preservation and display of modern and contemporary art from Israel and around the world.

History

The Tel Aviv Museum of Art was established in 1932 in a building that was the home of Tel Aviv's first mayor, Meir Dizengoff.  The Helena Rubinstein Pavilion for Contemporary Art opened in 1959. Planning for a new building began in 1963 when the museum's collections of modern and contemporary art began to outgrow the premises. Construction commenced in 1966 but stopped for two years due to shortage of funds. The new museum moved to its current location on King Saul Avenue in 1971.
 
Another wing was added in 1999 and the Lola Beer Ebner Sculpture Garden was established. The museum also contains "The Joseph and Rebecca Meyerhoff Art Education Center", opened since 1988.The museum houses a comprehensive collection of classical and contemporary art, especially Israeli art, a sculpture garden and a youth wing.

In 2018, the museum set an all-time attendance record with 1,018,323 visitors, ranking 70th on the list of most visited art museums. In 2019, the museum's ranking rose to 49th with 1,322,439 visitors.

Permanent collection
The Museum's collection represents some of the leading artists of the first half of the 20th century and many of the major movements of modern art in this period: Fauvism, German Expressionism, Cubism, Futurism, Russian Constructivism, the De Stijl movement and Surrealism, French art, from the Impressionists and Post- Impressionists to the School of Paris including works of Chaïm Soutine, key works by Pablo Picasso from the Blue and Neo-Classical period to his Late Period, Cubist paintings by Albert Gleizes, Jean Metzinger, several sculptures by Jacques Lipchitz, and Surrealists works of Joan Miró.

One section of the Museum displays the history of Israeli art and its origins among local artists in the pre-state Zionist community of the early twentieth century.

In 1989, the American pop artist Roy Lichtenstein created a giant two-panel mural especially for the Tel Aviv Museum of Art. It hangs in the entrance foyer.

The Collection includes several masterpieces, among them the painting Friedericke Maria Beer, 1916 by the Austrian artist Gustav Klimt and Untitled Improvisation V, 1914, by the Russian master Wassily Kandinsky.

The Peggy Guggenheim Collection, donated in 1950, includes 36 works by Abstract and Surrealist artists, including works of Jackson Pollock, William Baziotes, and Richard Pousette-Dart, and Surrealists works by Yves Tanguy, Roberto Matta, and André Masson.Sculptures are displayed in the entrance plaza and in an internal sculpture garden.
In addition to a permanent collection, the museum hosts temporary exhibitions of individual artists' work and group shows curated around a common theme.

Herta and Paul Amir Building

In November 2011, the Herta and Paul Amir Building on the western side of the museum opened. It houses an Israeli Architecture Archive, and a new section of Photography and Visual arts. The new building was designed by architect Preston Scott Cohen. The new wing houses 18,500 square feet of gallery space over five floors.

The Amir building also contains Pastel, a fine dining restaurant led by Chef Hilel Tavakuli.

Gallery

See also
Israeli art

References

External links
The Tel Aviv Museum of Art
 

Art museums established in 1932
Art museums and galleries in Israel
Modern art museums
Museums in Tel Aviv
1932 establishments in Mandatory Palestine